Madison is a surname of English origin that has become a popular given name in the United States. Madison, also spelled Maddison, is a variant of Mathieson, meaning son of Matthew. A different origin is alleged by some where Maddy is assumed to be the pet form of Maud and therefore the meaning is son of Maude.

Madison is also used as a given name. It has become popular for girls in recent decades. Its rise is generally attributed to the 1984 release of the film Splash. From an almost non-existent given name before 1985, Madison rose to being the second-most-popular name given to girls in the US in 2001. In 2021, the most recent year of available data, it was ranked twenty-ninth.

As a masculine given name, Madison can be found within the top 1,000 names for boys in the United States up until about 1952. The name returned to the top 1,000 in 1987, remaining there through 1999, and it was the 858th-most-common name for boys in 2004, but it remains uncommon as a masculine given name.

Surname

Bailee Madison (born 1999), American actress
Cole Madison (born 1994), American football player
Dolley Madison (1768–1849), wife of James Madison
George Madison (1763–1816), Governor of Kentucky
Guy Madison (1922–1996), American actor
Helene Madison (1913–1970), American competition swimmer
Holly Madison (born 1979), American model
James Madison (bishop) (1749–1812), first Bishop of the Episcopal Diocese of Virginia, cousin of James Madison
James G. Madison, known as the Mad Hatter (born 1956/57), convicted bank robber in New Jersey
James Jonas Madison (1884–1922), U.S. Navy commander
James Madison Sr. (1723–1801), father of James Madison
James Madison (1751–1836), fourth President of the United States
Joe Madison (born 1949), American political activist and radio host
Keith Madison, American college baseball coach
Lucy Foster Madison (1865–1932), American novelist
Martha Madison (born 1977), American actress
Michael Madison (born 1977), American serial killer
Piper Madison (born 2002), American singer
Robert P. Madison (born 1923), American architect
Sam Madison (born 1974), American football player
Talia Madison, an alternate ring name of American professional wrestler Jamie Szantyr (born 1981), best known as Velvet Sky
Tianna Madison (born 1985), American athlete
Ts Madison (born 1977) American entertainer, entrepreneur and LGBT activist

Given name

Male
Madison Smartt Bell (born 1957), novelist
Madison Bumgarner (born 1989), Major League Baseball pitcher
Madison Cawthorn (born 1995), American politician
Madison Cooper (1894–1956), American businessman
Madison Grant (1865–1937), lawyer, eugenicist, and conservationist
Madison Hedgecock (born 1981), American football player
Madison Hemings (1805–1877), son of Thomas Jefferson's slave/mistress Sally Hemings
Madison E. Hollister (1808–1896), justice of the Idaho Territorial supreme court
Madison Hughes (born 1992), American rugby player
Madison Jones (1925–2012), author
Madison Marye (1925–2016), American politician
Madison Nelson (1803–1870), justice of the Maryland Court of Appeals
Madison S. Perry (1814–1865), fourth governor of Florida
Madison Washington (circa 19th century), instigator of slave revolt

Fictional male characters
Madison Jeffries, comic book character in Alpha Flight
Madison "Mad" Twatter, minor character, played by Stephen Walters in British drama television series Skins

Female

Madison
Madison Anderson (born 1995), Miss Universe Puerto Rico 2019 and Miss Universe 2019 1st Runner-Up
Madison Bailey (born 1999), American actress
Madison Beer (born 1999), American singer
Madison Brengle (born 1990), American tennis player
Madison Browne (born 1988), Australian international netball player
Madison Cunningham (born 1996), American singer, songwriter and guitarist
Madison Davenport (born 1996), American actress and singer
Madison De La Garza (born 2001), American actress and younger sister of Demi Lovato
Madison Hubbell (born 1991), American ice dancer
Madison Iseman (born 1997), American actress
Madison Keys (born 1995), American tennis player
Madison Kocian (born 1997), American Olympic gymnast
Madison Lilley (born 1999), American volleyball player
Madison Lintz (born 1999), American actress
Madison McLaughlin (born 1995), American actress
Madison McReynolds (born 1993), American actress
J. Madison Wright Morris (1984–2006), American actress
Madison Nguyen (born 1975), American politician
Madison Nonoa, New Zealand-born soprano opera singer
Madison Pettis (born 1998), American actress
Madison Prespakis (born 2000), Australian Rules footballer
Madison Rayne (born 1986), American professional wrestler
Madison Thomas, Canadian film and television director
Madison Young (born 1980), American pornographic actress, stage name
Maddie Ziegler (born 2002), American dancer

Madisyn
 Madisyn Shipman (born 2002), American actress

Fictional female characters
Film
Madison, the mermaid in the film Splash and its sequel Splash, Too
Madison Russell, a main character in Godzilla: King of the Monsters and Godzilla vs Kong, played by Millie Bobby Brown.
Madison Wolfsbottom, one of the antagonists in the animated film Clifford's Really Big Movie

Television
Madison Clark, main protagonist portrayed by Kim Dickens in Fear The Walking Dead
Madison Duarte, cheerleader portrayed by Valery Ortiz in South of Nowhere
Madison James, businesswoman portrayed by Sarah Joy Brown in Days of Our Lives
Madison McCarthy, cheerleader portrayed by Laura Dreyfuss on Glee
Madison Montgomery, actress and witch portrayed by Emma Roberts in American Horror Story: Coven
Madison Rocca, the Blue Ranger in Power Rangers Mystic Force
Madison Rooney, high school student and one of two main protagonists and title characters jointly portrayed by Dove Cameron in Liv and Maddie
Madison Sinclair, student portrayed by Amanda Noret in Veronica Mars
Madison Taylor, a protagonist and costume designer portrayed by Maggie Blue O'Hara in the Cardcaptor Sakura English dub

Video games
Madison Paige, photographer, journalist and protagonist primarily portrayed by Judi Breecher in Heavy Rain

See also
Maddison, a surname and given name

References

English feminine given names
English masculine given names
English-language unisex given names
English unisex given names
Feminine given names
Masculine given names
Given names originating from a surname
English-language surnames
Patronymic surnames